Allawah railway station is located on the Illawarra line, serving the Sydney suburb of Allawah. It is served by Sydney Trains T4 line services.

History
Allawah station opened on 25 October 1925 on the same date that the Illawarra line was duplicated. It consists of two island platforms with an overhead concourse and ticket office at the northern end. The original brick station buildings were demolished in the 1990s and replaced by lighter passenger shelters. 

In 2001, the station was upgraded with the provision of passenger lifts and expanded shelters.

Platforms & services

Transport links
Transdev NSW operates one route via Allawah station:
947: Kogarah station to Hurstville

Allawah railway station is served by two NightRide routes:
N10 Sutherland station to Town Hall station
N11 Cronulla station to Town Hall station

References

External links

Allawah station details Transport for New South Wales

Easy Access railway stations in Sydney
Railway stations in Sydney
Railway stations in Australia opened in 1925
Illawarra railway line
Georges River Council